Reid Schmitt (born September 13, 1987) is a former American soccer player who formerly played for the now defunct Phoenix FC in the USL Professional Division.

Schmitt signed for Phoenix FC in November 2012, joining from FC Tucson.  During his season with Tucson, Schmitt played all 16 regular season matches, playing 1,175 minutes which was the 3rd highest of the team.  He scored one goal and had two assists.  He also played in all 90 minutes of the playoff game against Seattle Sounders U-23, coming out on the losing side 1–0.

Schmitt made his first professional appearance in Phoenix FCs opening match of their inaugural season in Los Angeles against the Blues.  Schmitt played the first 61 minutes of the 2–0 loss.

Schmitt made a total of 17 appearances for Phoenix FC during the 2013 season.

See also
 All-Time Phoenix FC roster

External links
 USL Pro profile 
 tucsonsentinel.com 
 

1987 births
Living people
American soccer players
FC Tucson players
Phoenix FC players
USL League Two players
USL Championship players
Soccer players from Arizona
Association football midfielders
Association football defenders